Robert Allen Spoo (November 2, 1937 – October 15, 2018) was an American college football coach. He served as the head football coach at Eastern Illinois University from 1987 to 2011 (with an interruption in 2006 due to surgery), compiling a record of 144–131–1. Spoo led the Eastern Illinois Panthers to five conference titles, nine playoff berths, and ten finishes in the Top 25 polls. He coached nine First Team All-Americans, including Tristan Burge and Tony Romo.

Spoo was an alumnus of Purdue University and a former quarterback on the Purdue Boilermakers football team. Prior to receiving the head coaching position at Eastern Illinois, Spoo served as an assistant at Purdue and the University of Wisconsin–Madison. He also coached at the high school level.

Spoo and his wife, Suzie, had one daughter. After retiring, the Spoos continued to reside in Charleston, Illinois. He died on October 15, 2018, at the age of 80.

Head coaching record

College

References

1937 births
2018 deaths
American football quarterbacks
Eastern Illinois Panthers football coaches
Purdue Boilermakers football coaches
Purdue Boilermakers football players
Wisconsin Badgers football coaches
High school football coaches in Illinois
People from Charleston, Illinois
Sportspeople from Chicago
Players of American football from Chicago